Lord Goldsmith may refer to:

 Peter Goldsmith, Baron Goldsmith, British Labour politician born in 1950
 Zac Goldsmith, Baron Goldsmith of Richmond Park, British Conservative politician born in 1975